
Lubin County (German:Lüben Kreis) is a unit of territorial administration and local government (powiat) in Lower Silesian Voivodeship, south-western Poland. It came into being on January 1, 1999, as a result of the Polish local government reforms passed in 1998. Its administrative seat and largest town is Lubin, and its only other town is Ścinawa.

As of 2019 the total population of the county is 106,211, out of which the population of Lubin is 72,428, the population of Ścinawa is 5,582, and the rural population is 28,201.

Neighbouring counties
Lubin County is bordered by Głogów County to the north, Góra County to the north-east, Wołów County to the east, Legnica County to the south and Polkowice County to the north-west.

Administrative division
The county is subdivided into four gminas (one urban, one urban-rural and two rural). These are listed in the table below, in descending order of population.

References

 
Land counties of Lower Silesian Voivodeship